Kai Hendrik Schäfer (born 13 June 1993) is a German badminton player. He competed at the 2020 Tokyo Olympics.

Achievements

BWF International Challenge/Series (4 titles, 2 runners-up)
Men's singles

Men's doubles

  BWF International Challenge tournament
  BWF International Series tournament
  BWF Future Series tournament

References

External links 
 

1993 births
Living people
Sportspeople from Darmstadt
German male badminton players
Badminton players at the 2020 Summer Olympics
Olympic badminton players of Germany
21st-century German people